Eugene Keefe Robinson (born May 28, 1963) is a former American football safety who played in the National Football League (NFL) for 16 seasons. He spent the majority of his career with the Seattle Seahawks, who signed him as an undrafted free agent in 1985. In addition to his 11 seasons with the Seahawks, he was a member of the Green Bay Packers and Atlanta Falcons for two seasons each and the Carolina Panthers for one season.

During his Seattle tenure, Robinson was named to two Pro Bowls and led the league in interceptions in 1993. Robinson's two seasons with the Packers saw him reach the Super Bowl in both years and win Super Bowl XXXI. With the Falcons, he earned a third Pro Bowl selection and made a third consecutive Super Bowl appearance.

Professional career

Seattle Seahawks
After playing college football at Colgate University, Robinson spent his first 11 NFL seasons with the Seahawks, being selected to the Pro Bowl twice in 1992 and 1993. Robinson is the Seahawks' 2nd all-time tackle leader and second in interceptions.

Green Bay Packers
After the 1995 season, Robinson signed with the Packers. That year, he recorded 55 tackles and led Green Bay with eight interceptions. After the 1996 season, the Packers went on to win Super Bowl XXXI 35–21, over his hometown team, the New England Patriots, earning Robinson a championship ring. Then again, after the 1997 season, Robinson and the Packers went to Super Bowl XXXII, however they lost 31–24, to the Denver Broncos. With his team trailing 24–17 in the third quarter, Robinson intercepted a pass from Broncos quarterback John Elway in the end zone, preventing Denver from building a bigger lead and setting up a touchdown on Green Bay's ensuing drive to tie the game. He also recorded an interception of Steve Young that set up a touchdown in the Packers 23–10 win over the San Francisco 49ers in the NFC title game two weeks prior.

Atlanta Falcons
After the 1997 season, Robinson joined the Atlanta Falcons in 1998. During the season, Robinson recorded 46 tackles, two fumble recoveries, four interceptions, and one touchdown return, earning his third career Pro Bowl selection. After making a game-saving play in the NFC Championship game (breaking up an otherwise certain winning touchdown to Minnesota Vikings wide receiver Randy Moss), Robinson made it to his third consecutive Super Bowl, facing the Broncos for the second straight season.

The night prior to Super Bowl XXXIII, Robinson was arrested by an undercover police officer for soliciting a prostitute. Earlier that day, Robinson received the Athletes in Action/Bart Starr Award, given annually to a player who best exemplifies outstanding character and leadership in the home, on the field and in the community. After the arrest, Robinson agreed to return the award.

The next day, without much sleep the night before due to the prostitution incident, Robinson gave up an 80-yard touchdown reception to Broncos receiver Rod Smith, giving the Broncos a 17–3 lead over the Falcons. Later, in the fourth quarter, he missed a tackle on Denver running back Terrell Davis that enabled Davis to break a long run to the Atlanta 10-yard line. The Atlanta Falcons ended up losing the game, 34–19, and Robinson was widely denounced by the press and fans for the previous night's incident. The next season was Robinson's last with the Falcons.

Carolina Panthers
After leaving the Falcons, Robinson joined the Carolina Panthers, and retired following the 2000 season.

Career summary
In his 16 seasons, Robinson recorded 1,415 tackles, 57 interceptions, 762 return yards, 22 fumble recoveries, 71 return yards, and two touchdowns (one fumble return, one interception return), and 7.5 sacks. His 57 interceptions have been exceeded by just 11 players, four of whom are in the Pro Football Hall of Fame.

Coaching and broadcasting career
Robinson served as a color analyst for the Carolina Panthers Radio Network from 2002-18. He currently serves as a varsity football and wrestling coach at Charlotte Christian School in Charlotte, North Carolina.

Beginning in January 2015, Robinson is a co-host of the morning television show Charlotte Today on WCNC-TV, Charlotte, NC.

Personal life
Robinson is a Christian and spoke with the Carolina Panthers team before Super Bowl 50.

References

External links
 Stats at Database football

1963 births
Living people
American Conference Pro Bowl players
American football safeties
Atlanta Falcons players
Carolina Panthers announcers
Carolina Panthers players
Colgate Raiders football players
Green Bay Packers players
High school football coaches in North Carolina
High school wrestling coaches in the United States
National Conference Pro Bowl players
National Football League announcers
Players of American football from Hartford, Connecticut
Seattle Seahawks players
Sportspeople from Hartford, Connecticut
Ed Block Courage Award recipients